Matailobau District is one of the districts of Naitasiri Province, Fiji. In the past the district consisted of the old tikina's (sub districts) of Nagonenicolo, Matailobau, Waima and Lutu until their separation due to Fijian administration restructure in the 1990s. The old tikina and present district of Matailobau consists of the villages of Nairukuruku, Navuniyasi, Taulevu, Delaitoga, Nabena and Matailobau.

References

Districts of Naitasiri Province